Mladost (meaning "youth" in Slavic languages) may refer to:

Placenames
Mladost, Sofia, municipality of Sofia, Bulgaria
Mladost, Varna, municipality of Varna, Bulgaria
Mladost, Obrenovac, municipality of city Obrenovac, Serbia.

Association football clubs
NK Mladost 127, former name of the Croatian club HNK Suhopolje
FK Mladost Apatin, Serbian club based in Apatin
FK Mladost Bački Jarak, Serbian club based in Bački Jarak
FK Mladost Bački Petrovac, Serbian club based in Bački Petrovac
FK Mladost Bosilegrad, Serbian club based in Bosilegrad
FK Mladost Carev Dvor, Macedonian club based in Carev Dvor
NK Mladost Cernik, Croatian club based in Cernik
FK Mladost Gacko, Bosnian club based in Gacko
FK Mladost Lončari, Bosnian club based in Lončari
FK Mladost Lučani, Serbian club based in Lučani
OFK Mladost Lješkopolje, Montenegrin club based in Donja Gorica, Podgorica
FK Mladost Medoševac, Serbian club based in Medoševac
FK Mladost Novi Sad, Serbian club based in Novi Sad
FK Mladost Podgorica, Montenegrin club based in Podgorica
NK Mladost Proložac, Croatian club based in Proložac
FK Mladost Sandići, Bosnian club based in Sandići

Basketball clubs
KK Mladost Bački Jarak, Serbian club based in Bački Jarak
KK Mladost Omoljica, Serbian club based in Omoljica
KK Mladost Mrkonjić Grad, Bosnian club based in Mrkonjić Grad
KK Mladost SP, Serbian club based in Smederevska Palanka
KK Mladost Vesna, Serbian club based in Bela Palanka
KK Mladost Veternik, Serbian club based in Veternik, Novi Sad 
KK Mladost Zaječar, Serbian club based in Zaječar
KK Mladost Zemun, Serbian club based in Zemun

Other sports clubs
Mladost (sports society), Croatian sports society based in Zagreb
HAOK Mladost, volleyball section
HAVK Mladost, water polo section
HAKK Mladost, basketball section
KHL Mladost, Croatian ice hockey club based in Zagreb